Al-Ghbrah is a Syrian town located in Abu Kamal District, Deir ez-Zor.  According to the Syria Central Bureau of Statistics (CBS), Al-Ghbrah had a population of 9,748 in the 2004 census. Al-Ghbrah was captured by Syrian Arab Army on 6 December 2017.

References 

Populated places in Deir ez-Zor Governorate
Populated places on the Euphrates River